This is a list of concert tours of South Korean girl group Wonder Girls.

1st Wonder Tour

The Wonder Girls 1st Wonder Tour was the first concert tour by Wonder Girls. The concert tour started first in Bangkok, Thailand then Busan and Seoul in South Korea, Shanghai, China and Pahang, Malaysia. The 1st Wonder in South Korea is Wonder Girls' 1st domestic solo concert in Korea since their debut in 2007.

Tour dates

Wonder Girls World Tour

The Wonder Girls World Tour was a 20-show tour by the Wonder Girls that took place in the US and Canada. The tour showcased the English and Korean versions of their hits, covers of popular English-language songs, and new songs from their album 2 Different Tears.

The Wonder Girls' reception in North America was very positive. The Wonder Girls were named House of Blues "Artist of the Month" for June 2010 and many of their shows were sold out and packed full.

During the tour, Mnet released teasers for Wonder Girls' reality program called Made in Wonder Girls. Starting from June 28, fans were able to watch short clips of the Washington DC, New York, and Chicago concerts. Mnet continued showing short clips of the tour until July 22 with the next batch being about the "Behind the Story" of Wonder Girls and 2PM. Made in Wonder Girls started airing by Mnet on July 30, 2010.

Set lists

Tour dates

Wonder World Tour

The Wonder World Tour was announced by JYP Entertainment several days after the release of the mini-album Wonder Party. The tickets for the tour went on sale through Yes24 and Interpark's ticket booth on June 12, 2012.

After stepping away from the domestic market, in order to focus on the American activities, the girls wanted to return to Asian fans who supported and waited for their return with their solo tour. When asked about their increased activities in Asia, the members replied, "Because we had to learn English in the States, the amount of time we spent there grew longer and longer, which meant we didn’t have a lot of time to see our Asian fans. In an effort to show and share more of us, we mutually agreed to increase our activities. We rushed the release of our new song for our first Korean concert in four years on July 7."

Set lists

Tour dates

References

 
Lists of concert tours
Lists of concert tours of South Korean artists
Lists of events in South Korea
South Korean music-related lists
K-pop concerts by artist